The Eio is a short but powerful river in the municipality of Eidfjord in Vestland county, Norway. The river is the lowermost part of the Eidfjord river system, which, in addition to the Eio, includes the Bjoreio and Veig rivers, which flow into Lake Eidfjord.

See also
List of rivers in Norway

References

Rivers of Vestland
Eidfjord
Rivers of Norway